Jelka is a large village and municipality in Galanta District of  the Trnava Region of south-west Slovakia.

Geography
The municipality lies at an elevation of 123 metres and covers an area of 32.658 km2. It has a population of about 3,908 people.

History
In the 9th century, the territory of Jelka became part of the Great Moravia, in 11th century part of Kingdom of Hungary. In historical records the village was first mentioned in 1237.
After the Austro-Hungarian army disintegrated in November 1918, Czechoslovak troops entered the area following cease-fire agreements with western powers. Later, newly created independent Hungary acknowledged full Czechoslovak sovereignty in their borders internationally by the Treaty of Trianon, apart of Hungary and Czechoslovakia signed also by France, Britain and USA. Hungarians respected their word until 1938, when, as agreed with Hitler, Jelka once more became part of Miklós Horthy's Hungary through the First Vienna Award. Hungary managed to keep this award until 1945 when Czechoslovak administration restored. From 1945 until the Velvet Divorce, it was part of Czechoslovakia. Since then it has been part of Slovakia.

It was also the birthplace of Rebbe Chaim Koenig.

Genealogical resources

The records for genealogical research are available at the state archive "Statny Archiv in Bratislava, Slovakia"

 Roman Catholic church records (births/marriages/deaths): 1732–1906 (parish A)
 Lutheran church records (births/marriages/deaths): 1701–1896 (parish A)
 Reformated church records (births/marriages/deaths): 1784–1910 (parish A)

See also
 List of municipalities and towns in Slovakia

References

External links
Statistics SK Mosmis
Surnames of living people in Jelka

Villages and municipalities in Galanta District
Hungarian communities in Slovakia